Charles Hubert Eyck (24 March 1897 – 2 August 1983) was a Dutch visual artist.

Life and work

Charles Eyck was born in 1897 in Meerssen. He received his training at the Rijksacademie in Amsterdam. He had previously started as a pottery painter at the ceramics factory Céramique in Maastricht. In 1922 he won the Prix de Rome. After short stays in Sweden, Curaçao, southern France, Amsterdam, Clamart and Utrecht, he settled in Schimmert.

Initially, his work was expressionistic in style. He was later criticized for persisting in a more or less consistent religious style. Partly because of these criticisms and his increasing deafness, he lived more and more in seclusion in the house "Ravensbos" in Schimmert, which he designed himself.

After the unveiling of the Bevrijdingsraam in the Sint Janskerk in Gouda (1947), Eyck was presented with the decoration of a Knight in the Order of Orange-Nassau. He returned the award almost twenty years later, because he could not agree with a marriage between Princess Beatrix and the German Claus.

Charles Eyck died at the age of 86.

Works 
 Begraafplaats van Aubel (1920), funerary chapel in Meerssen
 Fresco (1937) in the refectory of the Klooster Mariënhage in Eindhoven
 Het Verkeer (1939), design, in the context of 100 years of Dutch railways, executed by Jo Uiterwaal, Utrecht
 Polytiek (1941) in the Onze Lieve Vrouw van Goede Raadkerk in Beverwijk
 Windows (1945) of the city hall of Uithuizermeeden
 Stations of the Cross (1946) in the Sint-Franciscuskerk in Groningen
 Bevrijdingsraam (1947) in the Sint Janskerk of Gouda
 The official investiture painting (1948) of Queen Juliana
 Stained glass windows (1948/1950) in the Sint-Catharinakerk in Eindhoven
 Limburgs bevrijdingsmonument (1952) on the Koningsplein in Maastricht
 Wall painting (1953) in the officers' mess of the R.K. Zeemanshuis in Willemstad, Curaçao
 Tile panel (1954) of Elizabeth of Hungary on the back facade of the former Sint-Elisabeth Hospital in Willemstad, Curaçao
 Uniforms (1957) Schuttersgezelschap Sint Sebastiaan Schimmert
 Paintings and stained glass windows (1958) for the Jozef Arbeiderkerk in Meerssen
 Wall paintings (1962) in the church of Jeantes (Picardy)
 Altar wall and Stations of the Cross in Zeist
 Windows in the Roman Catholic HBS in Heerlen
 24 stained glass windows in the Sint Jozef kerk of Achterveld
 Stained glass windows in the Sint Martinuskerk in Venlo
 Stations of the Cross in Enschede, in the Koepelkerk in Maastricht and in Schijndel
 Stations of the Cross in Sint-Jan de Doperkerk in Waalwijk (1940-1943): due to Van Eyck's refusal to join the Kultuurkamer established by the German occupier, 3 of the 14 stations are not polychromed but still in the original terracotta colour
 Stations of the Cross in de Sint-Martinuskerk in Genk
 The painting of the vault and the apse in the St. Hubertuskerk in Genhout (municipality of Beek)
 Paintings in the Onze Lieve Vrouwe Kerk in Helmond, assisted by Daan Wildschut and Ries Mulder
 Paintings in the house at the Warandelaan in Helmond
 Church painting in the church of the Redemptoristenklooster in Wittem
 Church painting in the Sint-Barbarakerk in Bunnik
 Stained glass window in the former Chamber of Commerce of Venlo
 Illustrations for Karel en Elegast, by Jef Spuisers
 Stained glass windows in the Sint-Gerardus Majellakerk in Nederweert-Eind
 Apse of the Sint-Gerardus Majellakerk in Heksenberg-Heerlen
 Stained glass window in the former town hall of Hoensbroek
 Wall painting in the H. Andreas en Antoniuskerk in Oostelbeers

References

1897 births
1983 deaths
Dutch male painters
People from Meerssen